Tiger Man or Tigerman may refer to:

Fiction
 The Tiger Man, a 1918 American Western silent film by William S. Hart
 Tiger-Man, an Atlas/Seaboard Comics superhero
 Tiger Man, a character in the TV series Buck Rogers in the 25th Century
 Tigerman, a 2014 novel by Nick Harkaway

Music
 Tiger Man (album), by Elvis Presley, 1998
 "Tiger Man" (song), by Rufus Thomas, 1953; covered by Elvis Presley, 1968
 "Tigerman", a song by Goldfrapp from Silver Eye, 2017
 "Tigerman", a song by Teddybears STHLM from Rock 'n' Roll Highschool, 2000

People
 Gunther Gebel-Williams (1934–2001), trainer of tigers
 Kailash Sankhala (1925–1994), Indian naturalist and conservationist
 The Legendary Tigerman (fl. 21st century), Paulo Furtado, Portuguese blues performer
 Stalking Cat (1958–2012), an American who underwent body modification to resemble a tiger
 Stanley Tigerman (1930–2019), American architect